Joseph Arthur Roméo Desfossés (November 3, 1897 – April 1, 1980) was a provincial politician from Alberta, Canada. He served as a member of the Legislative Assembly of Alberta from 1951 to 1959 sitting with the Liberal caucus in opposition.

Political career
Desfosses ran for a seat to the Alberta Legislature in a by-election held on June 21, 1951, in the Grouard electoral district. He defeated two other candidates in a hotly contested race on second vote preferences to pick up the seat for the provincial Liberals.

Just over a year later Defosses ran for a second term in office in the 1952 Alberta general election. He held the district winning a small plurality on the first vote count, and hanging to win the three-way race on the second vote count by 150 votes.

Defosses ran for a third term in the 1955 Alberta general election. He won a larger popular vote, but was unable to secure a majority. On the second vote count Defossess easily held his seat defeating two other candidates.

Defosses retired from the legislature at dissolution of the assembly in 1959.

References

External links
Legislative Assembly of Alberta Members Listing

Alberta Liberal Party MLAs
1897 births
1980 deaths